Paulus Aertsz van Ravesteyn (c. 1586 – buried 3 November 1655, in Amsterdam) was a Dutch printer who worked for local publishers, individuals and also published books himself. At his May 19, 1608, marriage to Elisabeth Sweerts in Amsterdam he is said to be a 21-year old typesetter from Dordrecht. Possibly he originated from North Brabant where his family owned land.  His first own publication dates from 1611.

Publishing

A list of publishers van Ravesteyn worked for includes:

Amelisz, Jan Utrecht, 1609-1631
Banningh, Jan Amsterdam, 1619-1659
Blaeu-laken, Cornelis Willemsz, Amsterdam, 1622-1644
Brandt, Marten Jansz, Amsterdam, 1613-1649
Cloppenburgh, Jan Evertsz (II), Amsterdam, 1598-1637
Colijn, Manuel, Amsterdam, 1622–1632;
Cool, Cornelis Dircksz (I), Amsterdam, 1614–1651, 1666
Gerritsz, Hessel, Amsterdam, 1612-1630
Hendricksz, Fijt, Amsterdam, 1627, 1629, 1633
Heyns, Zacharias Zwolle, 1607-1629
Huybrechtsz, Abraham, Amsterdam, 1611-1616
Ilpendam, David Jansz van Leiden, 1617-1642
Janssonius, Johannes, Amsterdam, 1608, 1613-1664
Kempfer, Erasmus, Frankfurt am Main, 1612, 1614
Kempner, Anthonius, Frankfurt am Main, 1612
Kok, Dirrik Jelissen, Amsterdam, 1625
Koning, Abraham de, Amsterdam, 1615-1618
Koster, Herman Allertsz, Amsterdam, 1598–1616;
Laurensz, Hendrick, Amsterdam, 1607-1648
Meyer, Dirck, Amsterdam, 1628-1660
Mostarde, Pierre, Amsterdam, 1618
Neulighem, Anthonio van, Amsterdam, date unknown
Paets, Pieter Jacobsz, Amsterdam, 1616-1657
Pers, Dirck Pietersz, Amsterdam, 1607-1649
Pharar, Abraham, Amsterdam, 1627
Plasse, Cornelis Lodewijcksz van der, Amsterdam, 1613-1640
Roelandus, Titus, Amsterdam, 1618
Sweerts, Emanuel, Frankfurt am Main, 1612
Verberg, Nicolaes Ellertsz, Amsterdam, 1618-1620
Voscuyl, Dirck Pietersz, Amsterdam, 1610, 1614-1622
Wachter, Jacob Pietersz, Amsterdam, 1613-1649

References 

 List of publications: 
 initials and ornaments 

 
1580s births
1655 deaths
17th-century printers
Dutch printers
Printers from the Dutch Republic
Businesspeople from Amsterdam

17th-century Dutch businesspeople